Enoplida is an order of nematodes. It is one of two orders in Enoplia, which is one of two subclasses in Class Enoplea.

These nematodes are mostly free-living marine animals. Most feed on diatoms and other algaes.

Subdivisions 
Upon phylogenetic analysis in 2010, the order was divided into five clades. Clades and selected families include:

Clade I
Family Rhabdolaimidae
Clade II
Family Alaimidae
Family Ironidae
Clade III
Family Tripyloididae
Family Trefusiidae 
Clade IV
Family Oxystominidae
Family Oncholaimidae
Family Enchelidiidae
Clade V
Family Thoracostomopsidae
Family Enoplidae
Family Phanodermatidae 
Family Leptosomatidae

The World Register of Marine Species shows the following suborders within Enoplida:

Alaimina
Campydorina
Dioctophymina
Enoplina
Ironina
Oncholaimina
Trefusiina
Trichinellina
Tripyloidina

References

Bibliography 

Enoplia
Nematode orders